David Harris Davies (27 October 1877 – 30 September 1944) was a Welsh international rugby union forward who played club rugby for Neath and county rugby for Glamorgan. He won a single international cap, selected to play for Wales in 1904.

Rugby career
Davies was born in Tonna, Neath, and came through the ranks of local team Tonna RFC, before moving to Neath, considered the area's major rugby team. While with Neath, Davies also turned out for Glamorgan police and Glamorgan County. By the 1902/03 season, Davies was a prominent member of the Neath squad and was given the senior team captaincy.

Davies' most notable rugby match was his one and only international cap, being selected to represent Wales as part of the 1904 Home Nations Championship. The opening game of the Championship had resulted in a 14 all draw between England and Wales, and the Welsh selectors responded by bringing in five new caps, four of them forwards. Played against Scotland at Swansea Wales were led out by Willie Llewellyn. The game was a one-sided affair, with the Welsh forwards providing plenty of possession for the Welsh backs to control the play. Despite a heavy Welsh victory, the Welsh selectors made further changes for the next game, with Davies being one of those players dropped from the team.

Jenkins would later become a prominent member in Welsh rugby administration.

International matches played
Wales
  Scotland 1904

Bibliography

References

1877 births
1944 deaths
British police officers
Glamorgan County RFC players
Glamorgan Police RFC players
Glamorgan Police officers
Neath RFC players
Rugby union players from Neath Port Talbot
Rugby union forwards
Wales international rugby union players
Welsh police officers
Welsh rugby union players